Cedar! is the debut album by pianist Cedar Walton, recorded in 1967 and released on the Prestige label.

Reception

Allmusic reviewed the album, stating:"Pianist Cedar Walton's debut as a leader is quite impressive.... One of the top hard bop-based pianists to emerge during the 1960s, Walton also contributed four originals to his excellent set."

Track listing 
All compositions by Cedar Walton except where noted.
 "Turquoise Twice" – 7:19  
 "Twilight Waltz" – 4:20  
 "My Ship" (Ira Gershwin, Kurt Weill) – 5:34  
 "Short Stuff" – 6:25  
 "Head and Shoulders" – 4:15  
 "Come Sunday" (Duke Ellington) – 6:59  
 "Take the "A" Train" (Billy Strayhorn) – 3:29 Bonus track on CD reissue

Personnel 
Cedar Walton – piano
Kenny Dorham – trumpet (tracks 1, 2 and 5–7)
Junior Cook – tenor saxophone (tracks 1, 5 and 6)
Leroy Vinnegar – bass
Billy Higgins – drums

Production
Don Sclitten – producer
Richard Alderson – engineer

References 

Cedar Walton albums
1967 debut albums
Prestige Records albums
Albums produced by Don Schlitten